The 2016 AFC U-23 Championship (also known as the 2016 AFC U-23 Asian Cup) was the second edition of the AFC U-23 Championship, the biennial international age-restricted football championship organised by the Asian Football Confederation (AFC) for the men's under-23 national teams of Asia. The tournament was held in Qatar between 12–30 January 2016. A total of 16 teams compete in the tournament. The tournament was also renamed from the "AFC U-22 Championship" to the "AFC U-23 Championship".

For the first time, the AFC U-23 Championship acted as the AFC qualifiers for the Olympic football tournament, replacing the previous process of home-and-away Olympic qualifiers. The top three teams of the tournament qualified for the 2016 Summer Olympics men's football tournament in Brazil as the AFC representatives.

Japan won the tournament with a 3–2 final win over South Korea. Both finalists and third-placed Iraq qualified for the Olympics.

Host selection
Qatar was one of the countries which came forward wishing to host the finals competition. They were selected over the other bidding nations Uzbekistan, Saudi Arabia and Iran.

Qualification

The qualifiers draw was held on Thursday, 4 December 2014. A total of 43 teams were drawn into ten groups, with the ten group winners and the five best runners-up qualifying for the final tournament, together with Qatar who qualified automatically as hosts.

Qualification rounds were played between 23–31 March 2015, except for Group B which was scheduled to be held in Lahore, Pakistan, but was postponed due to the Lahore church bombings.

Qualified teams
The following 16 teams qualified for the final tournament.

Venues
The tournament was hosted in four stadiums, all located in Doha.

Draw
The draw for the final tournament was held on 12 September 2015, 12:00 AST (UTC+3), at the Four Seasons Hotel in Doha, Qatar. The 16 teams were drawn into four groups of four teams. The teams were seeded according to their performance in the previous edition in 2013.

Match officials
The following referees were chosen for the 2016 AFC U-23 Championship.

Referees

  Chris Beath
  Ma Ning
  Alireza Faghani
  Ali Sabah
  Ryuji Sato
  Adham Makhadmeh
  Kim Jong-hyeok
  Mohd Amirul Izwan Yaacob
  Ahmed Al-Kaf
  Abdulrahman Al-Jassim
  Fahad Al-Mirdasi
  Dmitriy Mashentsev
  Hettikamkanamge Perera
  Mohammed Abdulla Hassan Mohamed
  Ilgiz Tantashev

Assistant referees

  Nawaf Moosa
  Wang Dexin
  Reza Sokhandan
  Haruhiro Otsuka
  Ahmed Al Roalle
  Yoon Kwang-yeol
  Mohd Yusri Mohamad
  Abu Bakar Al-Amri
  Taleb Al-Marri
  Saud Al-Maqaleh
  Mohammed Al Abakry
  Abdullah Al-Shalawi
  Ismailzhan Talipzhanov
  Deniye Gedara Palitha Parakkrama Hemathunga
  Yu Hsu Min
  Mohamed Al-Hammadi
  Hasan Al-Mahri
  Jakhongir Saidov

Squads

Players born on or after 1 January 1993 were eligible to compete in the tournament. Each team could register a maximum of 23 players (minimum three of whom must be goalkeepers).

As the tournament was not held during the FIFA International Match Calendar, clubs were not obligated to release the players.

Group stage
The top two teams of each group advanced to the quarter-finals.

Tiebreakers
The teams were ranked according to points (3 points for a win, 1 point for a draw, 0 points for a loss). If tied on points, tiebreakers would be applied in the following order:
Greater number of points obtained in the group matches between the teams concerned;
Goal difference resulting from the group matches between the teams concerned;
Greater number of goals scored in the group matches between the teams concerned;
If, after applying criteria 1 to 3, teams still have an equal ranking, criteria 1 to 3 are reapplied exclusively to the matches between the teams in question to determine their final rankings. If this procedure does not lead to a decision, criteria 5 to 9 apply;
Goal difference in all the group matches;
Greater number of goals scored in all the group matches;
Penalty shoot-out if only two teams are involved and they are both on the field of play;
Fewer score calculated according to the number of yellow and red cards received in the group matches (1 point for a single yellow card, 3 points for a red card as a consequence of two yellow cards, 3 points for a direct red card, 4 points for a yellow card followed by a direct red card);
Drawing of lots.

All times were local, AST (UTC+3).

Group A

Group B

Group C

Group D

Knockout stage
In the knockout stage, extra time and penalty shoot-out would be used to decide the winner if necessary.

Bracket

Quarter-finals

Semi-finals
Winners qualified for 2016 Summer Olympics.

Third place play-off
Winner qualified for 2016 Summer Olympics.

Final

Winners

Awards
The following awards were given at the conclusion of the tournament:

Statistics

Goalscorers
6 goals

 Ahmed Alaa

5 goals

 Kwon Chang-hoon

4 goals

 Abdelkarim Hassan
 Moon Chang-jin

3 goals

 Liao Lisheng
 Yuya Kubo
 Omar Kharbin

2 goals

 Amir Arsalan Motahari
 Amjad Attwan
 Ali Husni
 Mohannad Abdul-Raheem
 Takuma Asano
 Shoya Nakajima
 Shinya Yajima
 Baha' Faisal
 Kim Yong-il
 Ryu Seung-woo
 Dostonbek Khamdamov

1 goal

 James Donachie
 Jamie Maclaren
 Chang Feiya
 Ali Karimi
 Milad Mohammadi
 Ehsan Pahlavan
 Mehdi Torabi
 Amjad Waleed
 Ali Faez Atia
 Ayman Hussein
 Mahdi Kamel
 Humam Tariq
 Saad Natiq
 Riki Harakawa
 Yōsuke Ideguchi
 Ryota Oshima
 Musashi Suzuki
 Yuta Toyokawa
 Naomichi Ueda
 Omar Manasrah
 Jang Kuk-chol
 So Kyong-jin
 Yun Il-gwang
 Kim Hyun
 Kim Seung-jun
 Jin Seong-uk
 Akram Afif
 Almoez Ali
 Ali Assad
 Abdulrahman Al-Ghamdi
 Fahad Al-Muwallad
 Mohammed Al-Saiari
 Mohamed Kanno
 Abdullah Madu
 Yousef Kalfa
 Mahmoud Al Baher
 Pinyo Inpinit
 Narubadin Weerawatnodom
 Chanathip Songkrasin
 Mohamed Al-Akbari
 Ahmed Al Attas
 Timur Khakimov
 Jaloliddin Masharipov
 Igor Sergeev
 Javokhir Sokhibov
 Đỗ Duy Mạnh
 Nguyễn Công Phượng
 Nguyễn Tuấn Anh
 Ahmed Al-Sarori

1 own goal

 Giancarlo Gallifuoco (playing against United Arab Emirates)
 Alaa Ali Mhawi (playing against United Arab Emirates)
 Thossawat Limwannasathian (playing against North Korea)
 Phạm Hoàng Lâm (playing against United Arab Emirates)

Tournament team rankings

Qualified teams for Olympics
The following three teams from AFC qualified for the Olympic football tournament.

1 Italic indicates host for that year. Statistics include all Olympic format (current Olympic under-23 format started in 1992).

Broadcasting rights

Controversies
Qatar, Syria and Yemen each had at least two players born on 1 January 1993, the cut off date for eligibility in this tournament.

References

External links
, the-AFC.com

 
2016
U-23 Championship
Football at the 2016 Summer Olympics – Men's qualification
2016
2015–16 in Qatari football
International association football competitions hosted by Qatar
AFC
January 2016 sports events in Asia